John Simalenga was  the Bishop of South-West Tanganyika: he died in 2013.

Notes

Anglican bishops of South-West Tanganyika
2013 deaths
21st-century Anglican bishops in Tanzania